John Ellis (c. 1803 – 22 March 1873) generally known as "Captain Ellis", was a pastoralist and businessman prominent in the early days of South Australia.

He was a son of Sarah (?) and Thomas Ellis, an Oxford clergyman of the Church of England.

Career
He arrived in South Australia from England on the Buckinghamshire on 22 March 1839, listed as "Captain Ellis", though on what basis it is not known, and in company of his brother George Ellis.

In July 1839 he and his longtime friend Captain William Allen purchased two thirds of "Milner Estate" near Port Gawler from George Milner Stephen, the misrepresentation of which transaction was to haunt Stephen in later years. In 1855 he purchased Allen's share. This area includes the land later known as Buckland Park, which he sold to Dr. J. H. Browne and Col. P. J. Browne in 1856. He took up the nearby Hummocks run in 1842,and Barabba, north-east of Mallala, South Australia, in August 1844.

He bought land in New Zealand.

Starting in 1851, he purchased over 50,000 freehold acres in the Hundreds of Benara and Blanche, between Mount Gambier and Port MacDonnell and 34 square miles of leasehold land, where he ran some 73,000 sheep, He purchased the remainder of Benara (originally spelled Benaira) and an adjacent station, Coola comprising 22,000 acres of freehold and 36,000 acres of leasehold, from the South Australian Company in 1875.

Managers
The general manager of most of his properties, and largely responsible for his good fortune, was Hugh Cameron (c. May 1796 – 10 June 1884). Born in the Braes of Rannoch, Scotland, he is reported as arriving in South Australia early in 1838, but perhaps arrived on the Thomas Harrison 25 February 1839, or the Lady Bute 18 June 1839. The Hundred of Cameron was named for him.

Another significant employee was J. C. Kennedy (c. 1827 – 10 October 1897), from the same part of Scotland, who managed the Benara and Coola properties for him, then for his son T. C. Ellis.

Politics
In June 1851 he accepted the petition of a number of electors for the seat of Flinders in the reconstituted Legislative Council, and in August 1851 became one of the first sixteen elected parliamentarians in South Australia.

Retirement and death

Having made a considerable fortune in South Australia, he retired with his wife Elizabeth and family back to England. His son Thomas took over his estates, and his children in turn continued to run Benara and Coola into the 20th Century. He died on 22 March 1873 in Kempton Park, Middlesex, England, at the age of 69, and was interred in Bay 49 (burial no.19275) of the Terrace Catacombs of Highgate Cemetery. The Cemetery recorded his age as sixty six.

Family

Ellis was married twice:

Marriage to Elizabeth Jane White Cathery 
Ellis' first wife, Elizabeth Jane White Cathery born in 1819 in Longfleet, Dorset. At the time, her father Desborough Cathery (b.1794 - d.1861) was  25, and her mother Jane Easton (b.1801 - d.1836), was 18. Elizabeth died on 17 August 1862 in Westminster, Middlesex, at the age of 43. Over the 18 years of their marriage they had 11 children. Their first born was Fanny Chute Ellis who was born on 3 March 1841 in South Australia. Fanny married David Edwards on 9 September 1873 in Kensington, Middlesex and together they had one child. She died in April 1874 in Caernarvonshire, Wales at the age of 33.

Ellis and Elizabeth's second child was Lucy Chute Ellis who was born on 22 September 1842 in Adelaide, South Australia. She had one son and one daughter with Herbert John Coningham and died on 2 July 1922 at the age of 79. Their third child was Annie Chute Ellis who was born on 14 May 1844 in Adelaide, South Australia. She married Frederick Robert Broughton on 29 August 1876 in Wyddial, Hertfordshire and they had two children during their marriage. Annie died on 12 October 1918 in Hertfordshire at the age of 74, and was buried in Wyddial, Hertfordshire. John Chute Ellis was their fourth child and he was born on 2 February 1847 in South Australia. He served with the 13th Huzzars in England and Canada, lived for a time at Benara, purchased Merrivale station on the South Island of New Zealand in Dunedin, Otago, then shifted to Tasmania. He married Jessie Margaret White on 20 March 1879; they had two children during their marriage. He died on 8 August 1926 in Hobart, Tasmania, at the age of 79.

The fifth child to result of Ellis and Elizabeth's marriage was Thomas Chute Ellis was born on 28 December 1848 at Bayley's Garden, Adelaide, South Australia, and educated at St. Peter's College, Charterhouse and Henley Royal Grammar School. He returned to Australia in 1869 and lived at Benara, taking charge of all his father's investments in Australia and New Zealand. In 1883 he gave the tower and clock of the Mount Gambier Town Hall at a cost of £1,000. He married three times: to Mary Victoria Barrow (1855 - 1877) on 7 April 1875, to Agnes Williams(1862 - 1888) in 1883, and Florence Rose Ayton(1860 – 1944) on 29 March 1893. He had four sons (one, Dr. J. C. Ellis, killed in Belgium in June 1917) and a daughter. He died on 21 December 1920 in Benara, South Australia at the age of 71.

Their sixth child was Elizabeth (Lizzey) Chute Ellis was born on 30 September 1850 in South Australia. She married Norton Aylmer Roupell in 1875. She died on 13 December 1939 in Aldershot, Hampshire, at the age of 89. Jane (Jenny) Chute Ellis was born on 29 February 1852 in South Australia and was the seventh child to be born to Ellis and Elizabeth. She married Richard Lyon Geaves on 9 August 1881 and together they had nine children in 14 years before she died on 8 January 1929 in Hartley, Wintney, Hampshire, at the age of 76. Their eighth child was called Jessie Chute Ellis who was born in 1854 in Adelaide, South Australia. She married William Watson Tolson on 3 August 1881 in England and they had six children during their marriage. She died on 3 January 1945 in Sutton, Coldfield, Warwickshire, at the age of 91.

Their ninth child, Chaloner Chute Ellis was born in 1855 in Adelaide, South Australia. He married Selina Anne Mary Eardley-Wilmot on 18 November 1886. They had two children during their marriage before he died on 18 January 1916 in Colchester, Essex, at the age of 61. Elizabeth and Ellis' tenth child was called William Chute Ellis and was born in 1856 in Adelaide, South Australia. He married Constance Ethel Bull in 1909 in Cuckfield, Sussex. He died on 1 October 1940 at the age of 84. Their eleventh and final child was named Bessie (Betty) Chute Ellis and was born in 1859 in Adelaide, South Australia, She married Lucius Joseph Collum and they had one daughter, Vera Collum. She then married John Prosser Adams in July 1895 before dying on the 1st od November 1955 in Aldershot, Hampshire, at the age of 96.

Marriage to Susan Hindmarsh 
His second wife Susan Hindmarsh, daughter of Sir John Hindmarsh, was born on 29 December 1810 in Rochester, Kent. She married John ELLIS on 9 November 1864 in Cotmanhay, Derbyshire and died on 24 August 1882 in Middlesex at the age of 71.

A brother Thomas Ellis (c. 1808 – 12 May 1841) arrived in Adelaide aboard Lord Glenelg on 10 May 1841 and died shortly after.

References 

1803 births
1873 deaths
Burials at Highgate Cemetery
Settlers of South Australia
Australian pastoralists

South Australian politicians
19th-century Australian politicians
19th-century Australian businesspeople